The Dragões (Portuguese for "dragons") was a flight demonstration team of the Portuguese Air Force that operated in the 1950s. It was created in 1956 as part of 20th Squadron, based at Ota Air Base and flew F-84 Thunderjet jet fighters until being deactivated in 1958. Later in the same year, it was reactivated as part of 51st Squadron, based at Monte Real Air Base and flying F-86 Sabre jet fighters, being definitely deactivated shortly after.

See also
Asas de Portugal

External links
Portuguese Air Force 201st Squadron page 
Recordar a patrulha "Dragões" 

Portuguese Air Force
Aerobatic teams
Military units and formations established in 1956